Hugh Murray Ingledew (26 October 1865 – 1 February 1937) was a Welsh international rugby union forward who played club rugby for Cardiff. Ingledew also played cricket for Glamorgan and was instrumental as a solicitor, in helping the local Cardiff cricket and rugby clubs purchase the Cardiff Arms Park in 1922.

Rugby career
Ingledew was first selected for Wales in a match against Ireland as part of the 1890 Home Nations Championship. Under the captaincy of Newport and Wales rugby superstar Arthur Gould, the game was a draw with a goal from each side. The match is more notable for the brawl between the two teams during the after-match dinner, where nine players found themselves in the Dublin Courts the next day. Later in 1890, Ingledew became a member of the touring invitational team The Barbarians, in their inaugural year.

In 1891 season, Ingledew was back in the Welsh squad when he was selected for the opening game of the 1891 Championship. Now under the captaincy of William Bowen, as Gould was working in the West Indies, Wales lost the match 7-3. Ingledew's final international game was the second match of the 1891 tournament against Scotland. Wales lost heavily by a goal and six tries and Ingledew, along with his half-back partner Ralph Sweet-Escott were dropped to be replaced by Swansea pairing, brother's Evan and David James.

Outside playing rugby, Ingledew was a solicitor, who specialised in railway law. Despite his favoured legal stance in transport law, he was chosen as the solicitor in completing the purchase of the Cardiff Arms Park in 1922. As a former sportsman with connections to cricket, and Cardiff Rugby club, Ingledew helped Cardiff Athletic Club purchase the ground from John Crichton-Stuart, 4th Marquess of Bute, for a sum of £30,000.

International matches played
Wales
  1891
  1890
  1891

Bibliography

References

Wales international rugby union players
Rugby union scrum-halves
Rugby union players from Cardiff
1865 births
1937 deaths
Cardiff RFC players
Barbarian F.C. players
Glamorgan cricketers
Welsh cricketers
Welsh solicitors
Oxford University RFC players
People educated at St Edward's School, Oxford